Curious Organism is a 2009 steel sculpture by Stan Carroll, installed outside a parking garage at Robert S. Kerr and N. Broadway in Oklahoma City, in the U.S. state of Oklahoma. It resembles a bacterium surrounded by cilia, standing on four legs.

See also

 2009 in art

References

External links
 Curious Organism at cultureNOW
 Curious Organism – Oklahoma City, OK at Waymarking

2009 establishments in Oklahoma
2009 sculptures
Abstract sculptures in the United States
Outdoor sculptures in Oklahoma City
Steel sculptures in the United States